Jason Snell (born October 6, 1970 in Oakland, California) is an American writer, editor, and podcaster whose professional career has been split between covering technology—heavily focused on Apple Inc.'s Macintosh computers, iPhones, and services—and pop culture. Snell was an early Internet publisher, producing the fiction journal InterText, as well as creating or editing several other early Internet magazines and websites. He served in a variety of editorial positions at IDG during more than 25 years, including as editor-in-chief of Macworld magazine. He finished up his IDG tenure serving as the senior vice president of IDG Consumer & Small Business Publishing (CSMB). He continues to write a weekly column at Macworld.

In 2014 Snell left Macworld and created Six Colors, a website that continues his coverage of technology and Apple products. He owns and operates the award-winning podcast network, The Incomparable, focused on panel discussions of a broad range of pop-culture, as well as offering a dedicated game-show podcast.

Biography
Snell grew up in the small town of Sonora, California, graduating from Sonora Union High School in 1988. He attended Revelle College at the University of California, San Diego, working for three years on the staff of the UCSD Guardian newspaper.

In 1991, while at UCSD, Snell founded InterText, an early Internet-based magazine, which was originally distributed via FTP and e-mail in plain-text and PostScript formats. (InterText was preceded by several groundbreaking Internet fiction magazines, including David 'Orny' Liscomb's FSFNet;  Jim McCabe's Athene; and Daniel K. Appelquist's science-fiction magazine Quanta.) InterText published hundreds of short stories in various genres until it ceased publication in 2004. (Snell later served on the board of the National Novel Writing Month, from 2011–2017.)

Snell graduated in 1992 with a degree in Communication. In 1994 he received a master's degree from the Graduate School of Journalism at the University of California, Berkeley.

Technology journalism 
In 1994 Snell began working at the U.S. edition of MacUser magazine, beginning his career writing about the Macintosh computer. When MacUser was bought and absorbed into Macworld in 1997, Snell moved with the magazine and became a significant Macworld staff member. Within a few years, he became the lead editor of Macworld, and eventually was promoted to a senior vice president at the magazine's publisher IDG. During this period, in 2006, the MDJ Power 25, a poll of Mac-industry-watchers, named him the 6th most powerful/influential person in the world of Macintosh computing. After multiple rounds of layoffs during a downturn in tech publishing, Snell departed the company in 2014.

In 1996, he co-founded Internet humor and commentary site TeeVee.org, which lives on through a podcast of the same name.

Following Snell's 2014 departure from Macworld and IDG, he created and launched Six Colors, a members-supported editorial website where he and his former Macworld colleague Dan Moren write about technology, Apple products, and podcasting. Six Colors produces

Podcasting 
In 2010 Snell began host and producing The Incomparable podcast, a weekly panel show discussing science-fiction, fantasy, and more general geek-culture television shows, movies, comic books, and book. The show soon expanded into an eponymous network which now hosts more than twenty shows from a variety of contributors. The Incomparable won the Parsec Award for Best Speculative Fiction Fan or News Podcast  in 2012, 2015, and 2016. Snell also co-hosts the Relay FM podcasts Liftoff, Upgrade, and Downstream.

Personal life 
He lives in Mill Valley, California, with his wife. He has two children.

References

External links
InterText (published 1991–2004)
Quanta (published 1989–1995)
Athene (published 1989–1990)
FSFnet (published 1985–1988)
Tech Talk for Families Interview
Six Colors website
The Incomparable podcast network

1970 births
Living people
American magazine editors
American online publication editors
American bloggers
Writers from Oakland, California
American reporters and correspondents
UC Berkeley Graduate School of Journalism alumni
University of California, San Diego alumni
American podcasters
21st-century American non-fiction writers
People from Sonora, California